None but the Brave is a 1965 Japanese-American film by Frank Sinatra.

None but the Brave may also refer to:

 None but the Brave (1928 film), a 1928 silent film
 None but the Brave (1960 film), a 1960 Western film
 None But the Brave (play), a 1925 farcical melodramatic play
 None but the Brave (cocktail)

See also 
 Only the Brave (disambiguation)